Abraxas is a deity in the Gnostic faith.

Abraxas, or the variant form Abrasax may also refer to:

Music 
 Abraxas (band), a Czech rock band
 Abraxas (album), a 1970 album by Santana
 Abraxas: Book of Angels Volume 19, a 2013 album by Shanir Ezra Blumenkranz
 "Abraxas", a song on the Dopethrone album Demonsmoke (2009)
 "Abraxas", a song on the Therion album Lemuria (2004)
 "Abraxas", an instrumental number on the Clarence Clemons album Peacemaker (1995)

Fiction 
 Abraxas (comics), a fictional cosmic entity in the Marvel Comics' universe
 Abraxas, Guardian of the Universe, a science fiction movie
 Abraxas Malfoy, paternal grandfather of Draco Malfoy in the Harry Potter book series
 Abraxas, a character in the 1992 Discworld novel Small Gods
 Abraxas, the symbolic godhead in the novel Demian by Hermann Hesse

Other uses 
 Abraxas (computer virus), a computer virus discovered in 1993
 Abraxas (market), a darknet market
 Abraxas (moth), a genus
 Kulturhaus Abraxas, in Augsburg, Germany
 Abraxas Foundation, a think tank founded by Boyd Rice

See also
Abraxis (disambiguation)